Girlfriends is a British comedy-drama television series, first broadcast on ITV on 3 January 2018. It follows the lives of three middle-aged women who have been friends since their teenage years. The series was written, created and directed by Kay Mellor. The drama was not renewed for a second series.

Cast

Main
 Phyllis Logan as Linda Hutchinson
 Miranda Richardson as Sue Thackery
 Zoë Wanamaker as Gail Stanley
 Philip Cumbus as Andrew Thackery, Sue's son
 Daisy Head as Ruby Hutchinson, Linda's daughter
 Matthew Lewis as Tom Drayton, Gail's son

Recurring
 Emmett J. Scanlan as DI Chris Donoghue
 Rochenda Sandall as DS Anne Thurston
 Kobe Jerome as Ben, Tom and Corinne's son
 Steve Evets as Micky Hutchinson
 Chris Fountain as Ryan Hutchinson, Linda's son
 Paula Wilcox as Carole Hardcastle
 Valerie Lilley as Edna, Gail's mother
 Adrian Rawlins as Dave, Gail's ex-husband
 Anthony Head as John, Sue's married lover and Andrew's father
 Wendy Craig as Barbara Thackery, Sue's mother
 Dave Hill as Frank, Barbara's boyfriend
 Matthew Marsh as Alan Forbes, Micky's insurance agent
 Rhea Bailey as Corinne Anderson, Tom's ex-girlfriend and Ben's mother

Episodes

References

External links

2018 British television series debuts
2018 British television series endings
2010s British drama television series
2010s British television miniseries
Adultery in television
English-language television shows
ITV television dramas
Television series about families